The Doubles competition at the 2020 FIL World Luge Championships will be held on 15 February 2020.

Results
The first run was held at 13:49 and the second run at 15:09.

References

Doubles